Cochemiea goodridgei is a species of plant in the family Cactaceae. It is endemic to Mexican state Baja California. It is also spelled as goodridgii and goodrichii. It was named after John Goodridge.

References

Plants described in 1926
goodridgei
Flora of Baja California